PP-249 Bahawalpur-V is a Constituency of Provincial Assembly of Punjab.

General elections 2013

General elections 2008

See also
 PP-248 Bahawalpur-IV
 PP-250 Bahawalpur-VI

References

Provincial constituencies of Punjab, Pakistan